West Hampstead is an area in the London Borough of Camden in north-west London. Mainly defined by the railway stations of the same name, it is situated between Childs Hill to the north, Frognal and Hampstead to the north-east, Swiss Cottage to the east, South Hampstead to the south-east, Kilburn to the west and south-west, and Cricklewood to the north-west. The area is mainly residential with several small shops, restaurants, cafes, bakeries concentrated on the northern section of West End Lane and around West End Green. It is served by three stations: West Hampstead on the Jubilee line, West Hampstead Overground station and West Hampstead Thameslink station. It is part of the Kilburn postal district (NW6).

History

West End hamlet
An area, known as "le Rudyng" (indicating a woodland clearing) in the mid-13th century, had by 1534 come to be called West End. It was then a freehold estate belonging to Kilburn Priory, and was so called because it was at the west end of another, larger estate. Although it is possible that there was a dwelling on the estate prior to 1244, an estate house was certainly extant by 1646. West End Lane (named as such by 1644), the main road through the area, is still bent at a right-angle at the north and south ends where it connects to Finchley Road and Edgware Road respectively. This is because the lane used to form the boundary between a number of different estates.

By the early 17th century several houses were present, and by the middle of that century London merchants were building larger houses in the area. By 1800 West End was a hamlet of two to three dozen houses and cottages located in parkland, mostly on the west side of West End Lane and Fortune Green Lane, and north of the present-day railway lines. West End Lane had been rerouted, making it straighter and lying further to the west than previously. In 1851 residents were mainly agricultural labourers, gardeners, craftsmen and tradespeople, with an innkeeper, two beershop keepers, a schoolmistress and a few gentry. There were three main large houses: West End House, West End Hall and Lauriston Lodge.

West Hampstead
Transformation of the area started with the construction of three railway lines across West End Lane: Hampstead Junction Railway, built by 1857; Midland line, opened in 1868; and Metropolitan & St. John's Wood line, opened in 1879. West Hampstead was the name adopted by Metropolitan & St. John's Wood for its station on West End Lane. The period of greatest development for the area was the 15 years from the opening of that station, with estates on the west side of West End Lane being turned from farmland and parkland into housing estates. Large scale development on the east side of West End Lane started in 1897, with the redevelopment of the properties where the three large houses of West End Hall, Canterbury House and Treherne House had stood until then.

Notable buildings and sites
 Emmanuel Church, an Anglican church on the corner of Lyncroft Gardens, opened in 1903.
 Hampstead Cemetery on Fortune Green Road, opened in 1876
 Hampstead Cricket Club moved to Lymington Road in 1877.
 Hampstead Synagogue on Dennington Park Road, built on the site of Lauriston Lodge, opened in 1892.
 Lilian Baylis House at 165 Broadhurst Gardens, opened in the 1880s. It was originally the Falcon Works, a place for tradespeople to work from. A few years later it was turned into a venue for concerts, meetings and other gatherings and named West Hampstead Town Hall. In 1928, Crystalate Gramophone Record Manufacturing took it over and moved its recording studio there. In 1937, Decca took it over and the building became Decca Studios until 1980. Artists including David Bowie and the Rolling Stones recorded there, but the Beatles failed their audition there on 1 January 1962, before they signed with Parlophone. It is now used as rehearsal space by the English National Opera.
 Railway Hotel on the corner of West End Lane and Broadhurst Gardens, built in 1881. From 1961 to 1970 it housed Klooks Kleek, a jazz and rhythm n’ blues club, whose notable acts included Cream, Ten Years After, Stevie Wonder, Buddy Guy and Rod Stewart. The live album John Mayall Plays John Mayall was recorded there in 1964 by running cables out of the window to Decca Studios, which was two buildings away.
 St. James Church on Sherriff Road, the first church in the UK to house a main-branch post office and community centre, the Sheriff Centre.
 West Hampstead Fire Station was opened in 1901 and is still operating, responding to over 2,000 emergency calls a year.

Transport links
There are three railway stations named West Hampstead, all within close proximity, and a number of other tube stations in the area. Numerous bus routes pass through the district.

 Tube: West Hampstead tube station, on the Jubilee line.  Nearby is Finchley Road tube station, on the Jubilee and Metropolitan lines.
 Trains: West Hampstead Thameslink station on the cross London Thameslink route, and West Hampstead Overground station on the North London Line.
 Buses: 139 (Golders Green to Waterloo via Oxford Street, 24 hours), 328 (Golders Green to Chelsea via Notting Hill), and C11 (Brent Cross Shopping Centre to Archway via Hampstead Heath).

Notable residents 
There are four English Heritage blue plaques in West Hampstead commemorating historic personalities that have lived there. The plaques mark the residences of painter David Bomberg at 10 Fordwych Road, conductor Sir Adrian Boult at 78 Marlborough Mansions on Cannon Hill, newspaper proprietor Alfred Harmsworth, 1st Viscount Northcliffe at 31 Pandora Road, and ophthalmologist Dame Ida Mann at 13 Minster Road.

Other notable people

 Gerry Anderson – publisher, producer, director and writer
 Joan Armatrading – singer and musician, resident in her early days
 Camila Batmanghelidjh – businesswoman, charity leader and author
 Sacha Bennett – filmmaker
 Dirk Bogarde – actor
 Paul Brightwell – actor
 Jim Carter – actor
 Jonathan Charles - Former BBC presenter and foreign correspondent
 Michael Clanchy - historian
 Gus Dudgeon – record producer, lived at Kings Gardens and worked at Decca Studios
 Maurice Feild – artist 
 Steven Finn – England and Middlesex County Cricket Club player
 Marina Fiorato – author 
 Stephen Fry – actor and television presenter
 GFOTY – artist and musician 
 Angela Griffin – actress and television presenter
 Julia Hartley-Brewer – radio presenter, political journalist and newspaper columnist
 Margot Heinemann – Marxist writer, leading member of the Communist Party of Great Britain, born at 89 Priory Road
 Barry Humphries – comedian, actor, satirist, artist, and author known for his character Dame Edna Everage
 Derek Jacobi – actor
 Chaka Khan – singer
 Phyllida Law – actress
 Doris Lessing – author
 Dua Lipa – singer and songwriter
 Matt Lucas – comedian and actor 
 Bill Nighy – actor
 Slash – guitarist for Velvet Revolver and formerly for Guns N' Roses
 Henry Spinetti – drummer, session musician and brother of actor Victor Spinetti
 Dusty Springfield – singer, born and lived on Sumatra Road
 Imelda Staunton – actress 
 Emma Thompson – actress, comedian and screenwriter
 Eric Thompson – actor, television presenter and producer
 Sophie Thompson – actress
 Johnny Vegas – actor, comedian
 Alec and Evelyn Waugh – authors, who grew up in Hillfield Road
 Greg Wise – actor

Location in context

Gallery

References

External links 
 Hampstead Scientific Society

Districts of the London Borough of Camden
Areas of London
District centres of London